Greenville County School District (GCSD) is a public school district in Greenville County, South Carolina (USA). It is the largest school district in the state of South Carolina and the 44th largest in the US. 

As of the 2019–2020 school year, the district, led by Superintendent Dr. W Burke Royster, serves 76,964 students  from Greenville and some parts of Laurens and Spartanburg counties. Spread across 106 education centers, the district currently employs 4,908 certified teachers. GCSD has an operating budget of $592.639 million for the 2017–2018 school year. GCSD has 14 National Blue Ribbon Schools, 9 Newsweek's Best High Schools, 21 Carolina First Palmetto's Finest Schools, 48 Red Carpet Schools, and 29 National PTA Schools of Excellence.

History

Early history
At the end of World War II, Greenville County had 86 school districts. The smallest was a one-room school; the two largest, Parker and Greenville City, served two-thirds of the student population.

On August 23, 1951 the Greenville County Board of Education, chaired by J. B. League, established the School District of Greenville County and appointed nine trustees, with A. D. Asbury as chair. Dr. William F. Loggins was the first superintendent. An educational program of greater equality began to emerge, mainly by consolidating smaller schools.

Public schools desegregation
In 1963, the local NAACP filed suit in the federal district court, for the children of A. J. Whittenberg and five other Black students to attend all-white schools. They were represented by Willie Smith and Matthew Perry, while the district was represented by its attorney E. P. (Ted) Riley. On April 14, after a federal judge gave the school board thirty days to reconsider, Superintendent Marion T. Anderson  announced that fifty-five black students would be transferred to sixteen white schools in 1964.

Integration did not go smoothly and in May 1968 the state supreme court declared freedom of choice plans unacceptable. Opposition organizations were formed including Citizens for Freedom of Choice, Citizens to Prevent Busing, and Concerned Black Parents, chaired by H. L. Sullivan. In February 1970, most all-black schools were closed. 60% of the black and 10% of the white students were reassigned. 75% of the busing involved black students.

Educational structure
GCSD students attend schools based primarily on the geographic location of their homes. Schools of a lower level 'feed into' a certain school of the next highest level, meaning that students leaving the lower level schools attend the higher level school. Exceptions to the feeder system are students wishing to enroll in the magnet schools programs offered in 12 schools, or those who participate in the International Baccalaureate, which is offered in its three levels at four clusters over the county. Parents of students may also request transfers out of their students' assigned schools for various reasons (such as to take classes unique to a particular school).

During the 2011 school year 4,380 students graduated from GCSD High Schools. Out of these nearly 90% pursued higher education, with a scholarship total of $95 million.

In the news

 In 2006, 21% of the 22,850 AP exams completed in South Carolina were taken by Greenville County students. The percentage of exams qualifying for college credit increased from 43% to 48% (2,192 of 4,568 exams).

 The school district has also established a foundation that has successfully raised funds for student programs.

 In 2005, six Greenville County elementary schools and two middle schools were identified in a study released by the South Carolina Education Oversight Committee (EOC) as reducing the achievement gap for at least one historically underachieving student group.
 Tanglewood Middle School shooting

Schools

Elementary schools 
The Greenville County School District has 51 elementary schools that serve its population of 75,000 students. Most of the schools serve grades kindergarten through 5th grade, however two schools, the Rudolph Gordon School and Sterling School Charles Townes Center for the Highly Gifted and Talented, serve kindergarten though 6th and kindergarten though 8th, respectively.

Middle schools

High schools

Career Centers 
The Greenville County School District offers four career centers to its students. Students in grades 9-12 can take elective classes at these schools in conjunction with their regular studies at the assigned high schools. Students completing courses at these career centers will be awarded with certain industry certificates.

Special Focus Centers

See also 

List of school districts in South Carolina
Bill Workman, former school board member

Notes
Greenville, A. V. Huff Jr., Conclusion: The Emergence of Modern Greenville
Magnet
IB
Achievement gap EOC

References

External links
Greenville CSD homepage

Education in Greenville, South Carolina
School districts in South Carolina
Education in Greenville County, South Carolina
1951 establishments in South Carolina
School districts established in 1951